BriSCA Formula 1 Stock Cars is a class of single-seater stock-car-racing in the UK with custom-built cars, with races conducted on walled oval tracks of either shale or tarmac of approximately a quarter-mile in length. The cars are of an open wheel design. The cars may be of any horsepower and drivers can use any engine they choose, with Chevrolet based small or big block V8 engines being the most popular. The season runs from March through to November, with occasional meetings during Christmas time.

Administration
BriSCA (British Stock Car Association) F1 Stock Cars are governed by the BriSCA Management Board, comprising three members of the association of promoters (BriSCA) and three members of the BSCDA (British Stock Car Drivers Association) together with an independent secretary. Rules and regulations relating to car specifications, race procedures, track requirements and all other aspects of the sport are updated annually by the BriSCA Management Board. All drivers wishing to race at a BriSCA F1 meeting have to be registered in advance by the BSCDA. All venues that stage BriSCA F1 racing must be licensed by BriSCA.

History
BriSCA F1 Stock Car racing can trace its roots to the first stock car race in United Kingdom, which was held at New Cross Stadium in London on Good Friday, 16 April 1954, promoted by a Northampton-born Australian showman called Digger Pugh. It was a great success with two further meetings taking place at New Cross before the next meeting took place at Odsal Stadium, Bradford, on 26 May 1954. The new craze spread rapidly around the country and was dubbed the "seven day wonder". Originally, the cars were slightly modified saloon cars, hence the term stock as opposed to race cars. Most of the cars were American models with V8 engines, with some  larger European cars. The cars were standard makes with wheel arches removed and with bumpers and roll bars added.

In 1956 the drivers' association was formed. In 1957, thanks to the efforts of Peter Arnold, a national numbering system was introduced, BriSCA, the association of promoters was formed and the Stock Car Racing Board of Control created. There was also an agreement that BriSCA would only use drivers of the drivers' association. From the initial explosion in 1954 things started to settle down, tracks opened and closed but racing rules were introduced and the cars became more refined, while star drivers started to emerge. BriSCA has raced continuously since 1954 and held over 5,500 meetings across the United Kingdom.

In 1975, about 30 southern based drivers broke away from BriSCA and formed their own association called SCOTA (Stock Car Oval Track Association). They were disappointed at the lack of F1 meetings being held in the south of the country. They raced for promoter Spedeworth in cars exactly the same as BriSCA F1. In 1978 it was renamed F1SCA (Formula One Stock Car Association). In 1980, F1SCA decided to introduce a five-litre limit, and make the cars slightly smaller. Renamed 'Formula 80' the cars are still running today under the name 'Spedeworth V8 Stock Cars'.

Cars

During the 1960s, the cars developed from stock road cars into specially built cars with fabricated chassis and race-tuned V8 engines. While NASCAR in the US also races specially-built race cars, they retain the appearance of a road car, unlike the BriSCA F1 which now bears no resemblance to a road car.

A modern BriSCA F1 configuration is front-engined, rear-wheel drive, and open-wheeled, with the driver located centrally. The cars are constructed on race engineered steel ladder chassis with robust roll-over-safety cages and aluminium sheet body panelling, There is no limit in engine capacity or number of cylinders but engines must be naturally aspirated (no fuel injection, no supercharging or turbo charging permitted) and the engine blocks must be cast iron. The most common engines used, due to their reliability and availability, are based on the American Chevrolet V8 engine in both small block (350 ci) 5.7 litre and big block (454 ci) 7.4 litre varieties, producing upwards of 740 bhp with approx 640 ft-lbs of torque but some cars are known to have been equipped with engines of 9 litre capacity (540 ci). Power is most typically delivered through a 'Doug Nash' style gearbox with two forward gears (one for racing) and reverse, and use a heavily modified Ford Transit rear axle with a locked differential.

The cars use 'American Racer' control tyres on the outside rear. The cars are also restricted in what dampers can be used, to control costs. Cars can reach speeds of 80–90 mph around a quarter-mile oval, so most cars use large roof mounted aerofoils, similar to those found on American sprint cars, to create downforce on the corners and provide some extra cornering grip. Wings are not compulsory, and the benefit is not proven.

Cars must weigh between 1,350 and 1,500 kg and due to always racing anticlockwise, the cars are limited to having a maximum of 52% of the weight on the left hand side of the car when viewed from the rear. Cars are weighed at each meeting to make sure they conform to this rule.
 
Many drivers use two separate cars; one set up primarily for use on shale or dirt ovals, while the other car will be set up for tarmac or asphalt ovals. However, a few drivers with limited budgets may optimise just one car for both surface types, changing various components for each different track and surface.

Grading of drivers
Each driver is graded according to past results, their roof or wing painted accordingly. Red roofs with amber flashing lights are known as 'superstar' grade; then red (star), blue ('A' grade), yellow ('B' grade) and white ('C' grade). Every month during the season, the list is recompiled based on points scored at that month's meetings, and drivers move up and down according to their latest position. There are restrictions on movement down the grades based on limited meetings raced at, and the previous highest grade reached. Novice drivers for their first three meetings are allowed to start at the back of the grid and show a black saltire on the rear cab panel, so that other drivers know to avoid deliberate contact with the new driver.

Championship winners are designated specific roof colours: gold for the world champion, silver for the national points champion, black and white checks for the British champion, and red and yellow checks for the European champion. If one driver wins more than one title, roof colours will be a combination of whatever titles have been won.

In stock car terminology, the roof colour will also be known as the 'top'; for example, cars with a white roof will be known as a 'white top' whereas a star driver will be termed a 'red top.'

Drivers are always referred to by their racing number and name, for example ‘53’ John Lund. Drivers tend to carry their racing number throughout their careers. If they win the world championship they can choose to race as number '1' until the next world championship.

Races
BriSCA F1 Stock Car races are normally held on short, approximately quarter-mile, oval tracks, either tarmac or shale. Heats usually consist of 16 laps, with meeting finals lasting 20 laps. Special events (such as the world final) are held over 25 laps.

The race line up is unique in that best drivers start at the rear of the field. The lowest, 'C' graded, drivers start each race at the front, then 'B', 'A' and 'star', while the 'superstars' start each race from the rear of the field. Championship races are usually gridded in qualifying order, with the highest qualifiers starting at the front of the grid.

The number of competitors at a meeting will usually aim to be around 60. The meetings usually consist of three heats (20 cars in each), a consolation race, a final and a grand national. The first eight from the heats qualify for the final. Those who do not qualify from the heats can race in the consolation race and the first six qualify for the final. The final usually consists of 30 cars, and the grand national race is open to all, with the winner of the final, if racing, given a one-lap handicap. If the number of cars racing is lower, around 40 cars, they can split the cars into a two-thirds format. Each driver races in two heats, with a compilation of points deciding who races in the final.

The grand national is an all season competition with the points collected resulting in a one-off race at the end of the season for the ‘grand national champion’

Use of contact
Stock car racing in the UK is often confused with banger racing where cars deliberately crash into each other. However, stock cars employ more subtle forms of contact where, typically, just enough force is employed to move the car in front wide to facilitate overtaking.

 Push: In this maneuver, a driver may contact the rear bumper of the car ahead with the front bumper of their own car, forcing the driver in front to overshoot a corner and "go wide" allowing overtaking. This is the most common form of overtaking employed and is most effective on corner entry.
 "Last bender": This is a form of push which normally happens on the final bend of the last remaining lap and is one of the key elements of contact stock car racing and generates a lot of emotion and encouragement from the crowd. Drivers may employ long distance lunges or use of extra force, to gain places or to displace the car leading the race in order to take a win.
 Nerf: In this maneuver, a driver may contact the side (nerf) rails of the car ahead with the front bumper of their own car which may cause the driver in front to be unable to maintain the optimum racing line around the corner. This technique has become more common in recent years and is typically employed mid corner.
 Spin: An attacking driver may position their car such that they contact the rear of the car in front from the side causing the car ahead to lose traction and spin. This is a relatively unusual technique partly because of the risk to the attacker of being blocked by the car they have spun but also because it is considered unsporting due to the competitor being spun losing a number of race positions.
 Follow in: An illegal move which may result in disciplinary action, a 'follow in' involves a driver using such excessive force to push the car ahead that both parties overshoot the bend and run into the safety fence or barrier. This maneuver may be used for the purposes of settling a score (in the case of a racing feud) with another driver or to prevent another competitor from completing an important race.

Race signals
Races are carefully monitored by track marshals placed at intervals around the track and the individual known as the 'Starter', positioned on a rostrum at the start/finish line who issues instructions to competing drivers via a system of flags. Additionally, traffic light signals are placed at suitable positions around the raceway.

 Green flag/green light: Racing conditions commence or resume.
 Yellow flag (waved)/flashing yellow light: Racing conditions are suspended; drivers should slow down and maintain their race positions. Any overtaking may be penalised.
 Yellow flag (static): Usually indicated by marshals to warn drivers of a hazard on the track such as a stationary car.
 Black flag: Used to indicate to a driver that they are disqualified from the race, usually due to damage to their car.
 Union Jack: Displayed when half of the race distance has been completed.
 Lap boards: The number of laps remaining is displayed to drivers so they may understand when to employ a 'last bender' (or when to defend against one). It is most typical that the last five or three laps are indicated to competitors.
 Chequered flag: Shown to the race winner to indicate that they have completed the race distance first.
 Red flag/red light: Immediate stop to racing conditions. All cars must become stationary when safe to do so.

World Championship

The World Championship is an annual competition and the premier stock car championship. The winner is granted the honour of racing with a gold roof and wing until the next World Final and may choose to race under number 1. The World Final is usually held in September. The host tracks, all of which are based in the UK, are chosen by the designated promoter.

The grid for the World Final is composed of drivers from the UK who are chosen through a series of qualifying rounds and two World Championship semi-finals. Drivers who fail to progress from the semi-finals may race again in a consolation semi-final to choose two more entrants, and the reigning world champion is entitled to start at the rear of the grid if they have not already qualified. The UK drivers are joined by stock car drivers from the Netherlands, and by invited drivers in the nearest equivalent motorsport formulas from other countries often including Australia, New Zealand, South Africa and the USA.

The most successful driver in world final races is John Lund, who has won eight. Other notable multiple winners include 391 Stuart Smith (six), 391 Andy Smith (five), 33 Peter Falding (four), 103 Johnny Brise, 252 Dave Chisholm , 515 Frankie Wainman Junior (three) 84 Tom Harris (three).

National Points Championship

The National Points Championship is a season-long competition. The winner is granted the honour of racing with a silver roof for the following season.

The first season-long championship started in 1956. Drivers' scores at every stock car meeting were recorded to create the championship table. During the late 1990s, when Frankie Wainman Junior dominated, there was criticism that the National Points Championship was predictable and favoured drivers who had the money to race at as many meetings as possible. The National Series was created in 2002. Rather than the points accumulated over the entire season counting towards the winner, the National Series was competed for over 35 designated meetings. The season-long National Points Championship survived, but its importance was downgraded, and the privilege of racing with a silver roof for the following season was transferred from it to the National Series.

In 2009, the National Series was amended. This time, the top ten points-scoring drivers over the first two-thirds of the season were entered in the National Series Shootout, beginning with no points except for a small number of meeting attendance points. The drivers raced over ten designated shootout rounds, with the points scored in them deciding the winner of the National Series. In 2010, the number of competing drivers was increased to twelve. From 2012, the National Series Shootout was rebranded the National Points Championship Shootout.

The most successful driver in National Points Championships and National Series is 515 Frankie Wainman Junior, who has won fourteen. Other notable multiple winners include 391 Stuart Smith (thirteen), 53 John Lund (six), 38 Fred Mitchell (three), 391 Andy Smith (three) and 212 Frankie Wainman (three).

Spectating
Cars, drivers and their pit crews can be accessed, approached and watched while they prepare or repair cars between races, with drivers generally being happy to allow children to sit on or in their cars for photographs as well as to discuss how their racing is progressing.

Watching the racing may be confusing for the uninitiated but it is generally useful at the start of a race to keep tabs on the low grade drivers ('white tops'), since they are prone to making mistakes, as well as the star drivers ('red tops') who start at the back of the grid. During these opening laps, drivers will jostle for position as they establish who has the best pace on the track. Star drivers will generally make their way through the field using a combination of speed, guile and contact while some of the lower grade drivers may 'break away' at the front. As the number of laps remaining counts down, excitement will build as to whether any breakaway cars can be caught and whether they are prepared to vigorously defend their positions against the higher graded drivers, especially if this culminates in an opportunity for a 'last bender.'

Spectators should keep one eye on the 'Starter' as they will be issuing position information to drivers as well as race instructions as they pass by. For example, in addition to the race control flags, the Starter will generally indicate to drivers in the first five race positions by simply holding out the relevant number of fingers (i.e. one finger to the leader, four fingers being shown to the 4th placed driver etc.) and this is the easiest way of keeping track of who is still in contention for a possible race win.

Action will not be confined to the lead cars, however - spectators should watch out for drivers who are frequently exchanging places further down the field as these are likely to result in one of the drivers deciding that the best course of action is to dispose of their opponent, usually into the fence.

Otherwise, it is useful to watch where cars have bunched together and fight for places or cars tipping as they may roll over - a common sight at stock car meetings.

Tracks
The active UK tracks where BriSCA F1 stock cars race are:

Buxton Raceway Buxton
King's Lynn Stadium
Owlerton Stadium, Sheffield
Skegness Stadium
Odsal Stadium  Bradford
Hednesford Hills Raceway, Staffordshire
Northampton International Raceway, Northants
Mildenhall Raceway, Suffolk
and outside the UK:

Raceway Venray Netherlands

Although not part of the official BriSCA calendar, BriSCA F1 drivers also occasionally compete at Emmen, Texel, St Maarten, Blauwhuis and Lelystad in the Netherlands and Warneton in Belgium.

Defunct tracks
The following tracks no longer host BriSCA F1. Some have been demolished, others continue to hold meetings for other formulae including BriSCA Formula 2 Stock Cars, Superstox and bangers:

Aldershot: Tongham Stadium 
Aycliffe Stadium
Barnsley
Belle Vue, Hyde Road, Manchester
Birmingham (Perry Barr)
Blackburn
Bolton
Boston
Bristol, Mendips Raceway
Bristol, Knowle
Carntyne Stadium, Glasgow
Cleethorpes
Coventry Stadium
Central Park, Cowdenbeath
Crayford Stadium
Crewe stadium
Doncaster
Dublin, Republic of Ireland
Eastbourne
Edinburgh (Meadowbank Stadium)
Harringay Stadium
Hartlepool
Leicester Stadium
Long Eaton
Neath Abbey
Nelson Seedhill Football Ground
Newcastle, Brough Park
Newtongrange (Scotland)
New Cross Stadium
Norwich
Oxford Stadium
Plymouth
Prestatyn
Purfleet
Reading Stadium
Rayleigh
Ringwood
Rochdale
Ryehouse
Scunthorpe, Ashby Ville Stadium 
Scunthorpe: Eddie Wright Stadium
Scunthorpe: Quibell Park.
Southampton
St Austell
Staines
Loomer Road Stadium, Stoke-on-Trent
Stoke (Sun Street, Hanley) 
Swaffham
Swindon
Tamworth
Walthamstow Stadium
Old Wembley Stadium
West Ham Stadium
Weymouth
White City, Glasgow (Scotland)
White City, Greater Manchester
Wimbledon Stadium
Wisbech (SCOTA only)
Wolverhampton
Woolwich
Yarmouth Stadium

Big tracks:
Baarlo (Netherlands)
Brands Hatch
Cadwell Park
Knockhill Racing Circuit (Scotland)
Lydden Hill Race Circuit
Mallory Park
Snetterton Motor Racing Circuit

Media
The 1980s saw BriSCA F1 Stock Cars on national television, featured on ITV's World of Sport.  During 2009, the BBC filmed an F1 Stock Car season almost in its entirety to produce a six-part television documentary titled Gears and Tears which featured the bitter battle between the two dominant clans in the sport, the Yorkshire-based Wainmans and the Lancashire-based Smiths. Over the nine-month season the film makers enjoyed unprecedented behind the scenes access. From 2011, satellite television channel Premier Sports began broadcasting selected meetings. Since September 2017, FreeSports (Freeview, FreeSat) have broadcast BriSCA F1 meetings with no payment to view required.

PC simulation
Simulation of BriSCA F1 stock car (and other oval formulas) racing can be played on a PC via specially created 'mods', which exist for both the Nascar Heat and rFactor motor racing simulation game engines. rFactor requires a relatively recent PC specification. Racing can be simulated either off-line (against computer controlled cars) or on-line, with some organised racing leagues existing that mimic the real life racing fixture list and drivers in the leagues may opt to use replicas of real life cars or personalised 'skins' created using popular graphical editing tools. Accurately modelled stock car tracks that are either current or defunct may be downloaded for the modifications allowing for contemporary or nostalgic racing.

There is also a game on Xbox One called Stockcars Unleashed 2. It uses real car liveries, drivers and UK ovals and a championship racing format.

References

Further reading

External links
Official website of BriSCA F1
Official website of BSCDA
F1 Stockcars - Latest F1 News and Information
BriSCA F1 Stox - Archive of Drivers and Race results
V8 Stock Cars
Oldstox - Photographic history of BriSCA F1 and F2 racing from 1955 to 1975
American Racer Tires
The Oval Racing Marketplace

Stock car racing in the United Kingdom
Stock car racing
Racing car classes